Emerson Jeka (born 18 September 2001) is a professional Australian rules footballer with the Hawthorn Football Club in the Australian Football League (AFL).

Early career

Emerson Jeka was always a tall boy for his age. Eventually reaching 197 cm in height, the boy with the strong marking and the ability to kick with both feet saw him rated highly among AFL recruiters. He played the majority of his NAB League football in the forward line. He suffered a knee injury while representing an Australian under-18 team against the VFL's Casey Demons at the MCG in April 2019. He was sidelined for almost two months, and some were surprised that he slipped down the ratings.

AFL career

Jekas' AFL career started by playing with the Hawthorn affiliate Box Hill Hawks, here under the tutelage of Hawthorn aligned coaches he spent his first year developing for the rigors of AFL football. Jeka had to negotiate a difficult COVID-19 affected season. He showed promise during the scratch matches against other AFL clubs. Despite not making his senior debut in his first year at Hawthorn, Emerson Jeka certainly made some strong impressions in 2020 with some powerful contested marking.

His development in 2021 has been rapid, quickly becoming one of the most in-form players in the VFL competition. The second-year Hawk earn't his call up off the back of a string of performances for Box Hill, amassing 19 goals from his last four outings. He made his debut against  at Marvel stadium.

Jeka kicked 0.7 in a VFL match on the third of July 2021.

He was promoted to the main list in December 2021. Jeka started 2022 as an emergency for the first game of the season, then he returned to the Box Hill side and seemed to lose form. A five game stint in the VFL which included five goals before half time against the Essendon (VFL) he was cut down by a hamstring injury that left him on the sidelines for six weeks. He return via the backline at Box Hill and showed his versatility as a defender. He took advantage of injuries in the senior side to play three games before the season end.

Statistics
Updated to the end of the 2022 season.

|-
| 2020 ||  || 39
| 0 || — || — || — || — || — || — || — || — || — || — || — || — || — || — || 0
|-
| 2021 ||  || 39
| 4 || 2 || 2 || 13 || 13 || 26 || 7 || 4 || 0.5 || 0.5 || 3.3 || 3.3 || 6.5 || 1.8 || 1.0 || 0
|-
| 2022 ||  || 39
| 3 || 0 || 0 || 21 || 13 || 34 || 13 || 3 || 0.0 || 0.0 || 7.0 || 4.3 || 11.3 || 4.3 || 1.0 || 0
|- class="sortbottom"
! colspan=3| Career
! 7 !! 2 !! 2 !! 34 !! 26 !! 60 !! 20 !! 7 !! 0.3 !! 0.3 !! 4.9 !! 3.7 !! 8.6 !! 2.9 !! 1.0 !! 0
|}

References

External links

Living people
2001 births
Hawthorn Football Club players
Box Hill Football Club players
Australian rules footballers from Victoria (Australia)
Western Jets players